Luis Camnitzer (born November 6, 1937) is a German-born Uruguayan artist, curator, art critic, and academic who was at the forefront of 1960s Conceptual Art. Camnitzer works primarily in sculpture, printmaking, and installation, exploring topics such as repression, institutional critique, and social justice. For over five decades, his practice has explored the psychological and political dimensions of language.

Early life and education
Luis Camnitzer was born in Lübeck, Germany in 1937 and moved to Montevideo, Uruguay in 1939. In 1953, he studied at the University of Montevideo's Escuela Nacional de Bellas Artes, where he concentrated on sculpture and architecture. In 1957, Camnitzer received a grant from the German government to study at Akademie der Bildenden Künste München At the Akademie, Camnitzer was mentored by sculptor Heinrich Kirchner.

Career and Practice
In 1960 Camnitzer held his first solo exhibition at the Centro de Artes y Letras Montevideo  and the following year began teaching at the Escuela Nacional de Bellas Artes. Camnitzer subsequently moved from Montevideo to New York City in 1964. In New York, he and fellow artists Liliana Porter and José Guillermo Castillo founded the New York Graphic Workshop (1964–1970), a studio focused on redefining the medium of printmaking and dedicated to reviving its importance as a contemporary art form. Concurrent to his practice with the New York Graphic Workshop, Camnitzer produced foundational works that explored the reflexive relationships between the viewer and artwork by means of language, such as This Is a Mirror, You Are a Written Sentence (1966–68). Beginning in the late 1960s and evolving into the 1970s and 80s, his practice also expanded to examine socio-political issues, including the oppression and cruelty of military dictatorships in Latin America. As an example, his work Leftovers (1970) consists of 80 stacked boxes, stained with fake blood and wrapped with surgical bandages, alluding to state-sanctioned violence and repression during dictatorship. Also in this period, Camnitzer produced a series of "object-boxes" in which ordinary items were placed inside wood-framed glass boxes with textually descriptive brass plaques. Infusing the material approach of the object-boxes with political content, Camnitzer produced one of his most important works, the Uruguayan Torture Series (1983–84). This series of photo-etchings emphasizes the artist's interest in combining socio-political critique with the psychological implications of text and images. Since the 1980s Camnitzer has produced installations and site-specific works, such as A Museum is a School (2009–present), in addition to his continuing practice in printmaking. In 2018 a retrospective exhibition, Luis Camnitzer: Hospicio Para Utopias Fallidas, opened at Museo Reina Sofia.

Themes
Since the 1960s, Camnitzer has focused on political subjects including identity, language, freedom, ethics, and historical tragedy. As Jane Farver discusses, "conceptual in nature, [Camnitzer's] work is powerful and evocative; it is often humorous, and sometimes deeply disturbing. Always, he challenges and implicates the viewer"

Personal life
Camnitzer is a Uruguayan citizen. He lives and works in Great Neck, New York and taught at SUNY Old Westbury, where he is currently professor emeritus. Camnitzer has written several books, including New Art of Cuba (1994) and Conceptualism in Latin American Art: Didactics of Liberation (2007). He is represented by Alexander Gray Associates.

Representation in public collections

 ARCO Corporation, New York, NY
 Biblioteca Communale, Milan, Italy
 Bibliothèque Nationale, Paris, France
 Blanton Museum of Art, University of Texas, Austin, TX
 Cabinet of Drawings and Prints of the Uffizzi, Florence, Italy
 Casa de las Américas, Havana, Cuba
 Centro Galego de Arte Contemporánea, Santiago de Compostela, Spain
 Centro Wifredo Lam, Havana, Cuba
 Colby College Museum of Art, Waterville, ME
 Colección Patrica Phelps de Cisneros, Caracas, Venezuela/New York, NY
 Daros-Latinaamerica, Zürich, Switzerland
 Fonds Régional d’Art Contemporain de Lorraine, France
 Israel Museum, Jerusalem, Israel
 J. Paul Getty Museum, Los Angeles, CA
 The Jewish Museum, New York, NY
 Library of Jerusalem, Israel
 Malmö Stad, Sweden
 Metropolitan Museum of Art, New York, NY
 Museo de Arte Contemporáneo de Castilla y León, León, Spain
 Museo de Arte Latinoamericano de Buenos Aires, Argentina
 Museo de Arte Moderno, Bogotá, Colombia
 Museo de Arte Moderno, Buenos Aires, Argentina
 Museo de Arte Moderno, Cartagena, Colombia
 Museo de Arte y Diseño Contemporáneo, San José, Costa Rica
 Museo de Artes Plásticas, Montevideo, Uruguay
 Museo de Bellas Artes, Caracas, Venezuela
 Museo de Gráfica y Dibujo Latinoamericano, Roldanillo, Colombia
 El Museo del Barrio, New York, NY
 Museo del Grabado, Buenos Aires, Argentina
 Museo La Tertulia, Cali, Colombia
 Museo Nacional Centro de Arte Reina Sofía, Madrid, Spain
 Museo Nacional de Artes Visuales, Montevideo, Uruguay
 Museo Nacional de Bellas Artes, Havana, Cuba
 Museo Nacional de Bellas Artes, Santiago, Chile
 Museo Universitario de Arte Contemporáneo, Mexico City, Mexico
 Museu de Arte Contemporânea da Universidad de São Paulo, Brazil
 Museum Lodz, Łódź, Poland
 Museum of Contemporary Art, Skopje, Republic of Macedonia
 Museum of Contemporary Graphic Art, Fredrikstad, Norway
 Museum of Fine Arts, Houston, TX
 The Museum of Modern Art, New York, NY
 Museum Wiesbaden, Germany
 National Museum of Modern Art, Baghdad, Iraq
 The New York Public Library, New York, NY
 Queens Museum, New York, NY
 São Paulo Museum of Art, Brazil
 Smithsonian American Art Museum, Washington, DC
 Snite Museum, Notre Dame University, South Bend, IN
 Solomon R. Guggenheim Museum, New York
 Tate Modern, London, United Kingdom
 Walker Art Center, Minneapolis, MN
 Whitney Museum of American Art, New York, NY
 Yeshiva University, New York, NY

Awards and recognition
 2014	Premio Anuale de Literature 2014, Ensayo de Arte, Ministry of Education and Culture, Uruguay
 2012	United States Artists Ford Fellow, Visual Arts	John Jones Art on Paper Award, Art Dubai: Skowhegan Medal for Conceptual & Interdisciplinary Practices 
 2011	Frank Jewett Mather Award, College Art Association
 2002	Konex Mercosur Award for Uruguay
 1998	Latin American Art Critic of the Year Award, Argentine Association of Art Critics
 1996	First Prize, ES96, Tijuana Salón Internacional de Estandartes
 1991	Art Matters Foundation
 1982	Guggenheim Fellowship for Visual Art
 1978	Creative Arts Program Services for Sculpture
 1974	Prize, British International Print Biennial
 1970	Prize, Biennial de San Juan del Grabado Latinoamericano, San Juan, Puerto Rico
 1968	Purchase Prize, Museum of Trenton, New Jersey
 1965	Memorial Foundation for Jewish Culture
 1961	Guggenheim Fellowship for Creative Printmaking

References

External links
 Luis Camnitzer in the collection of The Museum of Modern Art
 Luis Camnitzer artist page, Alexander Gray Associates

1937 births
Living people
Uruguayan academics
Uruguayan artists
Uruguayan art critics
Uruguayan expatriates in the United States
Uruguayan Jews
Uruguayan male writers
German emigrants to Uruguay
Jewish emigrants from Nazi Germany
Political artists
State University of New York at Old Westbury faculty